Mai Văn Hòa (Hanoi, 1 June 1927 - Saigon, 14 May 1971) was a table tennis player from South Vietnam.

From 1953 to 1957 he won several medals in singles, doubles, and team events in the Asian Table Tennis Championships and in the World Table Tennis Championships.

Results from the ITTF database

See also
 List of table tennis players
 Table tennis at the 1958 Asian Games

References

1927 births
1971 deaths
Sportspeople from Hanoi
Vietnamese table tennis players
Asian Games medalists in table tennis
Table tennis players at the 1958 Asian Games
Medalists at the 1958 Asian Games
Asian Games gold medalists for Vietnam
20th-century Vietnamese people